is a Japanese actress and singer signed to Stardust Promotion.

Biography
Yasuko Matsuyuki was born in 1972 in Tosu, Saga. In 1989, while she was in high school, Matsuyuki won a Non-no fashion magazine contest. After graduating from Tosu Commercial High School, she moved to Tokyo and started her career as a model.

In 1991, Matsuyuki made her film debut in the TV drama series "Nekketsu Shinnyū Shain Sengen". In 1993, she played an outgoing leading role in the manga based drama series "Shiratori Reiko de Gozaimasu!". That role made a big impact on the drama scene and established her career as an actress.

In 1998, after a 2-year relationship, Matsuyuki married guitarist . She had a baby boy in 2001, but got divorced in 2005.

Matsuyuki has two younger brothers.

Filmography

Movies

TV dramas

Stage

Commercials
Shiseido – Frische (1991)
Japan Airlines – JAL New Route (1991)
Tokyo Broadcasting System – Spring IG (1991)
Hitachi – Personal Fax Machine Bishamon (1992)
Hitachi – G Video series (1992–1994)
Italian Trade Commission Fashion Group – Moda Made in Italy (1993)
Suntory – Bikkle (1993)
Hitachi – Surf & Snow (1993)
Hitachi – 8mm Pon Pa (1993)
Ezaki Glico – Cereal Pocky (1993–1994)
ExxonMobil – Tiger Pro Card (1994)
Kosé – Lechéri (1994–1996)
Nissin – Yakisoba U.F.O (1995)
Asahi Breweries – Ururu (1995)
Bourbon – Dessert Chocola (1995)
Kansai Tele Message (1995)
Honda – Civic (1995)
Honda – Civic Ferio (1995)
Coca-Cola – Lactia (1995–1996)
Bristol-Myers Lion – My Balance (1995–1996)
Snow Brand Milk Products – Frozen Mix Pizza (1996)
Mitsui Life Insurance (1996–2000)
Sanyo Shokai – Fragile (1997)
Nissan – Presea (1997)
Kodak Japan (1998)
Meiji Dairies – Café Recio (1998)
Takarajimasha – Spring (1999)
All Nippon Airways (1999)
Kanebo – T'Estimo (1999–2000)
Seed Co. – Vivid Moon (1999–2000)
Minolta – Vectis (2000)
Otsuka Pharmaceutical Co. – Fibe-Mini (2002–2003)
Seiko – Lukia series (2003–2004)
Kanebo – Dew (2004)
Tokyo Tatemono – Tokyo Front Court (2004)
Uniqlo – Style Up Pants (2005)
SSP Co. – Hythiol-C Premiere (2006)
Kanebo – Dew Superior (2007-ongoing)
Properst – Plaza Vert (2008)

Dub

Live-action
The Bourne Legacy, Dr. Marta Shearing (Rachel Weisz)

Animation
Coco, Mamá Imelda

Discography

Singles
"ESP" (June 21, 1995)
 (November 8, 1995)
 (November 8, 1995)
"Wish" (December 10, 1995)
 (May 25, 1996)
 (February 19, 1997)
"Happy Happy Days" (July 24, 1997)
 (September 26, 1997)
 (May 13, 1998)
 (January 13, 1999)

Albums
Pray (December 21, 1995)
 Mondodelix (March 19, 1997)
 32'05" (June 17, 1998)

Compilations
 M.M.M (February 17, 1999)

References

External links
Yasuko Matsuyuki official website
 

1972 births
Living people
Japanese film actresses
Japanese television actresses
Actors from Saga Prefecture
Musicians from Saga Prefecture
Stardust Promotion artists
Universal Music Japan artists
20th-century Japanese actresses
21st-century Japanese actresses